Gibelacher is a town close to Merligen in Berner Oberland, Switzerland. Gibelacher is not located just to Thunersee but ca. 200 metres up the mountains. Gibelacher has no railway station but has a regular bus traffic to Sagi, Schwanden, Merligen and Oberhofen. Cities close to Gibelacher includes Spiez, Thun and Interlaken.

Geography of the canton of Bern
Bernese Oberland